Andrew J. Cusick (December 1857 – August 6, 1929) was an Irish-born catcher in Major League Baseball from 1884 to 1887. He played for the Wilmington Quicksteps and Philadelphia Quakers. Cusick was 5 feet, 9 inches tall and weighed 190 pounds.

Playing career
Cusick was born in Limerick, Ireland, in 1857. He started his professional baseball career in 1883 with the Interstate League's Wilmington Quicksteps. The following season, he played for the Quicksteps of the Eastern League and Union Association and made his major league debut in August. Later that month, Cusick jumped to the National League's Philadelphia Quakers. He had a batting average of .143 in 20 MLB games that season.

Cusick was a back-up catcher for the Quakers for the next few years. In 1885, he played in 39 games and led the NL's catchers in errors, with 57, while batting .177. His final MLB appearance was in June 1887. He then signed with the Western Association's Milwaukee Brewers for 1888, as a first baseman. The Sporting Life reported that "[Cusick] comes to Milwaukee highly recommended by Fogarty, Wood and Mulvey, of the Philadelphias, who say he is a good batsman, a No. 1 baseman, and, if necessary, can go behind the bat and hold up that position with the best of them." After batting .260 in 48 games, Cusick was released in July, and his playing career ended. In 95 career major league games, he batted .193 with no home runs and 15 runs batted in.

Later life
In May 1889, Cusick got a job as an umpire in the Western Association. According to the Sporting Life that month, "[Cusick] umpired the Omaha series, and gave fair satisfaction. His decisions were not in favor of one club more than another but his base decisions were decidedly off color." After he umpired a game in June, the Milwaukee Journal reported that he "gave some very doubtful decisions on both sides and was especially incorrect on calling balls and strikes and of course brought down the anathemas of the vigorous-lunged 'bleachers' upon himself in consequence."

Cusick continued to umpire games during the 1890 season. By January 1891, he had become a deputy constable in St. Louis. He died in Chicago, in 1929 and was buried in Mt. Olivet Cemetery.

See also
List of players from Ireland in Major League Baseball

References

External links

Retrosheet

1857 births
1929 deaths
19th-century baseball players
Major League Baseball catchers
Major League Baseball players from Ireland
Irish baseball players
Irish emigrants to the United States (before 1923)
Wilmington Quicksteps players
Philadelphia Quakers players
Wilmington Quicksteps (minor league) players
Milwaukee Brewers (minor league) players
Milwaukee Creams players
19th-century baseball umpires
Minor league baseball umpires
Sportspeople from Limerick (city)